Țiriac (pronunciation: [t͡siriˈak]) may refer to:
Ion Țiriac (born 1939), Romanian businessman, and former tennis and ice hockey player
Ion Țiriac Sports Complex, an outdoor sporting venue in Brașov, Romania
Ţiriac Holdings, a Romanian company primarily owned by Ion Ţiriac
Romanian Open, also known as BRD Năstase Țiriac Trophy
Țiriac Air, a Romanian corporate charter airline